Youngman Field at Alumni Stadium is a 3,500-capacity multi-use stadium in Middlebury, Vermont on the campus of the NCAA Division III-affiliated Middlebury College. Opened in 1991, it serves as home to the school's football and lacrosse teams.

Seven year lacrosse home winning streak

Youngman Field was host to a 45-game winning streak by the Middlebury men's lacrosse team that began in April 1997 and ran until the NCAA Division III Semi-finals in March 2004.

References

College football venues
College lacrosse venues in the United States
American football venues in Vermont
Lacrosse venues in the United States
Middlebury Panthers football
1991 establishments in Vermont
Sports venues completed in 1991